The 2013 Empire Slovak Open was a professional tennis tournament played on outdoor clay courts. It was the fifth edition of the tournament which was part of the 2013 ITF Women's Circuit, offering a total of $75,000 in prize money. It took place in Trnava, Slovakia, on 6–12 May 2013.

WTA entrants

Seeds 

 1 Rankings as of 29 April 2013

Other entrants 
The following players received wildcards into the singles main draw:
  Dalma Gálfi
  Kateřina Siniaková
  Petra Uberalová
  Natália Vajdová

The following players received entry from the qualifying draw:
  Katarzyna Kawa
  Petra Krejsová
  Kristína Kučová
  Renata Voráčová

The following player received entry into the singles main draw as a lucky loser:
  Vivien Juhászová

The following player received entry by a Protected Ranking:
  Ajla Tomljanović

Champions

Singles 

  Barbora Záhlavová-Strýcová def.  Karin Knapp 6–2, 6–4

Doubles 

  Mervana Jugić-Salkić /  Renata Voráčová def.  Jana Čepelová /  Anna Karolína Schmiedlová 6–1, 6–1

External links 
 2013 Empire Slovak Open at ITFtennis.com
 Official website

Empire Slovak Open
Clay court tennis tournaments
Tennis tournaments in Slovakia
2013 in Slovak tennis